Choi Yo-seb (born 22 September 1989) is a retired South Korean footballer.

Club career
Choi joined Busan I'Park in 2011, and made his first league appearance on 6 March 2011, coming on as a late substitute in Busan's away win over Jeju United. In one of his few starts in 2011, the majority of his appearances being as a substitute, Choi scored his first professional goal in a 2011 K-League Cup match against Gangwon FC, ensuring his side a comfortable two-nil win.

Club career statistics

References

External links 
 
 

1989 births
Living people
Association football forwards
South Korean footballers
Busan IPark players
Gangwon FC players
Gimcheon Sangmu FC players
K League 1 players
K League 2 players